The SC 50 (Sprengbombe Cylindrisch) or cylindrical explosive bomb in English was a family of general-purpose bombs used by the Luftwaffe during World War II.

Design 
The bomb was usually filled with a mixture of 40% amatol and 60% Trotyl, but when used as an anti-shipping bomb it was filled with Trialen, a mixture of 15% hexogen, 70% Trotyl and 15% aluminium powder. The SC 50 could be fitted with either an anti-ricochet adapter for anti-ship use or a Stabo Spike that kept the bomb upright and exploded the bomb before it buried itself for anti-personnel use. It could be vertically or horizontally suspended in a bomb bay or horizontally mounted on a wing or fuselage hardpoint.

Variants

Standard

 (SC 50 Bi) Single piece cast steel body which is machined down.  All fittings are welded into place. A single transverse fuze pocket is located slightly forward of the horizontal lug. The fuze pocket is secured to the opposite wall with a single weld.  The fuze pocket will accommodate two picric pellets along with a normal sized electric fuze. The nose has threading which will accommodate an eye-bolt utilized for vertical suspension. A shock plate (similar to a kopfring) may be welded to the bomb nose in an attempt to prevent ricochet when utilized against targets located in the water.

Grade I

 (SC 50 Ja) The Ja variant is made from a one-piece drawn steel body.
 (SC 50 L) The L variant is the same as the Ja variant with the exception that its body is made from seamless tubular steel.

Grade II

 (SC 50 J) The J was made as a one-piece nose and body with the base welded to the body.
 (SC 50 JB) The JB variant is the later model of the J variant, with identical construction.  
 (SC 50 JC) The JC variant was composed of two pieces, nose and body.  The nose was made of pressed steel and the body was made of drawn steel.  The nose and base plate were welded to the body of the bomb body.
 (SC 50 J/2) The J/2 variant was similar to the JC variant with the exception of the quality of steel used for manufacturing. This variant was only produced in limited quantities.

2015 Wembley bomb
In May 2015 an SC 50 was unearthed at a building site on Empire Way in Wembley, London.  The bomb was dropped during The Blitz on London by the Luftwaffe in 1940.  Bomb disposal experts from 11 Explosive Ordnance Disposal in the Royal Logistic Corps attempted to defuse it, however, the disarming was unsuccessful and the bomb was later removed and safely detonated at a secret location.

Popular culture
In the Dad's Army episode "Something Nasty in the Vault", an unexploded SC50 traps Captain Mainwaring and Sergeant Wilson in the bank vault.

Photo gallery

References

External links

World War II aerial bombs of Germany